Arne Ragneborn (13 July 1926 – 5 January 1978) was a Swedish actor, film director and screenwriter. He appeared in 23 films between 1944 and 1976. Ragneborn starred in the film Leva på 'Hoppet', which won the Silver Bear (Comedies) award at the 1st Berlin International Film Festival.

Selected filmography
 While the City Sleeps (1950)
Living on 'Hope' (1951)
 Encounter with Life (1952)
 Speed Fever (1953)
 Hidden in the Fog (1953)
 A Night in the Archipelago (1953)
 Café Lunchrasten (1954)
 The Vicious Breed (1954)
 Paradise (1955)
 Girls Without Rooms (1956)
 Never in Your Life (1957)
 Anita: Swedish Nymphet (1973)

References

External links

1926 births
1978 deaths
Male actors from Stockholm
Swedish male film actors
Swedish film directors
Swedish male screenwriters
20th-century Swedish male actors
20th-century Swedish screenwriters
20th-century Swedish male writers